Cirkus bude! is a 1954 Czechoslovak comedy film directed by Oldřich Lipský. The film starred Josef Kemr.

References

External links
 

1954 films
1950s Czech-language films
Czechoslovak comedy films
Films directed by Oldřich Lipský
Czech comedy films
1954 comedy films
1950s Czech films